Ondřej Starosta (born 28 May 1979) is a Czech former professional basketball player.

Player career
1995/98  Slavia Praha
1998/00  Sparta Praha
2000/01  Real Madrid youth team
2001/02  Go Pass Pepinster
2002/03  Le Mans
2003/04  Saint Quentin Saos
2004/05  Espé Châlons-en-Champagne
2005/06  Strasbourg
2006/09  CAI Zaragoza
2009/09  Plus Pujol Lleida
2009/10  Melilla Baloncesto
2010/11  Club Ourense Baloncesto
2011/13  Grupo Iruña Navarra
2013/15  Inter Bratislava

Honours
CAI Zaragoza
LEB Champion: 1
2008

External links
 Official CB Lleida website

1979 births
Living people
Basket Navarra Club players
Basket Zaragoza players
BK Inter Bratislava players
Centers (basketball)
Club Ourense Baloncesto players
Czech expatriate basketball people in Spain
Czech men's basketball players
Le Mans Sarthe Basket players
Liga ACB players
Melilla Baloncesto players
RBC Pepinster players
SIG Basket players
Sportspeople from Prague
USK Praha players